Grant Harvey (born June 30, 1984) is an American actor who is known for starring in films and television series such as Animal Kingdom, The Crossing, The Secret Life of the American Teenager, Thumper and Billy Boy.

Early life 
Harvey was born and raised in Hawthorne, Nevada, to parents Debbie and John Harvey. Harvey holds a Journalism degree from the University of Nevada, Reno.

Career 
Harvey landed his first acting gig on ABC Family's The Secret Life of the American Teenager, marking the start of his acting career. He guest-starred on TV series Masters of Sex, Supernatural, Lucifer, CSI, NCIS and Criminal Minds. He had a recurring role in Dan Fogelman's The Neighbors. In 2017, Harvey starred in a drama-crime movie Billy Boy, and Jordan Ross' movie Thumper, produced by Cary Joji Fukunaga. In April 2018, Harvey appeared as Roy in The Crossing and in 2019 as Colin, in the fourth season of TNT's Animal Kingdom.

Filmography

Film

Television

References

External links

American male film actors
American male television actors
People from Hawthorne, Nevada
Living people
1984 births